John Joseph Hopfield (born July 15, 1933) is an American scientist most widely known for his invention of an associative neural network in 1982. It is now more commonly known as the Hopfield network.

Biography
Hopfield was born in 1933 to Polish physicist John Joseph Hopfield and physicist Helen Hopfield. Helen was the older Hopfield's second wife. He is the sixth of Hopfield's children and has three children and six grandchildren of his own.

He received his A.B. from Swarthmore College in 1954, and a Ph.D. in physics from Cornell University in 1958 (supervised by Albert Overhauser). He spent two years in the theory group at Bell Laboratories, and subsequently was a faculty member at University of California, Berkeley (physics), Princeton University (physics), California Institute of Technology (Chemistry and Biology) and again at Princeton, where he is the Howard A. Prior Professor of Molecular Biology, Emeritus. For 35 years, he also continued a strong connection with Bell Laboratories.

In 1986 he was a co-founder of the Computation and Neural Systems PhD program at Caltech.

His most influential papers have been "The Contribution of Excitons to the Complex Dielectric Constant of Crystals" (1958), describing the polariton; "Electron transfer between biological molecules by thermally activated tunneling" (1974), describing the quantum mechanics of long-range electron transfers; "Kinetic Proofreading: a New Mechanism for Reducing Errors in Biosynthetic Processes Requiring High Specificity" (1974); "Neural networks and physical systems with emergent collective computational abilities" (1982) (known as the Hopfield Network) and, with D. W. Tank, "Neural computation of decisions in optimization problems" (1985). His current research and recent papers are chiefly focused on the ways in which action potential timing and synchrony can be used in neurobiological computation.

Awards and honours
He was awarded the Dirac Medal of the ICTP in 2001 for his interdisciplinary contributions to understanding biology as a physical process, including the proofreading process in biomolecular synthesis and a description of collective dynamics and computing with attractors in neural networks, and the Oliver Buckley Prize of the American Physical Society for work on the interactions between light and solids. Hopfield was elected as a member of the National Academy of Sciences in 1973, a member of the American Academy of Arts and Sciences in 1975, and a member of the American Philosophical Society in 1988. In 1985, Hopfield received the Golden Plate Award of the American Academy of Achievement. He received the Albert Einstein World Award of Science in 2005. He was the President of the American Physical Society in 2006. Hopfield has been chosen for the prestigious Boltzmann Medal award for the year 2022 . It is bestowed upon a scientist with exceptional contributions in the field of statistical physics, every three year. Hopfield shares the prize with Deepak Dhar.

Students
His former PhD students include Sir David MacKay, Terry Sejnowski, Bertrand Halperin, Steven Girvin, Erik Winfree, David Beratan, Li Zhaoping, and José Onuchic.

References

External links
 Homepage at Princeton
 User:John J. Hopfield – Scholarpedia

American biophysicists
1933 births
Living people
Albert Einstein World Award of Science Laureates
Artificial intelligence researchers
MacArthur Fellows
Fellows of the American Physical Society
Members of the United States National Academy of Sciences
California Institute of Technology faculty
Princeton University faculty
University of California, Berkeley College of Letters and Science faculty
Cornell University alumni
Swarthmore College alumni
21st-century American physicists
20th-century American physicists
21st-century American biologists
Place of birth missing (living people)
Members of the American Philosophical Society
Fellows of the American Academy of Arts and Sciences
Oliver E. Buckley Condensed Matter Prize winners
Presidents of the American Physical Society